Marichjhapi massacre (also known as Marichjhapi incident) refers to the eviction of Bengali Hindu Dalit refugees who forcibly occupied legally protected reserve forest land on Marichjhapi island in the Sundarbans, West Bengal, in 1979, and the subsequent death of some refugees and policemen due to gunfire by violent action and disease.

Background
After the division of Bengal (during independence in 1947) along communal lines many Hindu Bengalis fled East Pakistan (now Bangladesh). The first flow of refugees who were mostly the upper and middle classes from upper castes easily resettled in West Bengal. However most lower caste Hindus remained behind, seeing their plight as no better than the Muslims. But this latter huge flow of poor, mostly low-caste Hindus  couldn't be accommodated in Bengal. This later surge reached its peak in 1970's. During this time in 1976 Ram Niwas Mirdha said in Lok Sabha that Bengal had become saturated and relocating migrants was inevitable.

There was resistance from refugees (hailing from wetland marshy coastal landscape) against the relocation to wastelands. However, after initial resistance from they were forcibly sent to "rocky inhospitable semi arid land" of Dandakaranya (mostly in Orissa, Madhya Pradesh and Chhattisgarh), Terai (Uttar Pradesh, now in Uttarakhand), and Little Andamans. Most of them were destined to bear the brunt of an already failed Dandakaranya Project.

Left Front leaders like Ram Chatterjee then opposed the relocation policy of Union Govt. They reached out to migrants by visiting camps in Dandakaranya and promised them that if  the Left Front comes to power in West Bengal then all migrants would be brought back and settled in Bengal itself.

The incident 
Once the Left Front came to power in 1977, the refugees started to return to Bengal in huge numbers. Approximately 150,000 refugees, which was almost all of Dandakaranya, arrived. But the Left Front had changed its policy on refugee settling and considered the refugees as a burden to the state, and that the refugees were not the citizens of West Bengal but of India. Approximately 150,000 refugees, which was almost all of Dandakaranya, arrived, where most of them were deported back. In the meanwhile around 40,000 refugees went south to Hasnabad, Hingalganj and Geonkhali, and about 15000 settling in the small island of Marichjhapi (renamed by them as "Netaji Nagar"), a protected place under Reserve Forest Act. A survivor claims that there were only shrubs on the island when they came. They were involved in fishing and had built schools and hospitals.

The Left government considered that unauthorized occupation of a reserved forest land, and subsequent chain of migrations that it may lead to in that area could result in a severe ecological disaster. The government pursued them to return to their respective place, but with little effect. On 24 January 1979, the Government of West Bengal clamped prohibitory orders under Section 144 of the CrPC around the island of Marichjhapi. The police and the district administration started an economic blockade. Thirty police launches started patrolling the island, preventing anyone from providing food and water to the residents of the island.

Eyewitness accounts say that on 31 January, the police opened fire on the settlers of the island, when the settlers allegedly attacked a police camp with traditional weapons, killing 13 people. After 15 days Calcutta High Court ruled that "The supply of drinking water, essential food items and medicines as well as the passage of doctors must be allowed to Marichjhapi".

Some of the remaining 250-300 refugees were then sent back to Dandakaranya while the rest were escorted in police launches to Hasnabad. Some of them were settled in Marichjhapi Colony near Barasat while others rehabilitated themselves in the shanties near railway tracks in Sealdah. Some of the survivors resettled themselves in Hingalganj, Canning and nearby areas.

This incident is the most violent and brutal human right violation that took place in post-independence India until the 1983 Nellie massacre, 1984 anti-Sikh riots and Kashmir valley conflicts of the 1990's took place.

Death toll
The death count could never be confirmed but different accounts have put it anywhere between 50 and over 1,000. The official toll was two.

See also 
 1964 East Pakistan riots
 Dandakaranya Project
 The Hungry Tide, a novel by Amitav Ghosh

References

Further reading 
 Mandal, Jagadish Chandra (2002). Marichjhapi: Naishabder Antarale. Sujan Publications.
 Sengupta, Sukharanjan (2010). Marichjhapi Beyond & Within. FrontPage Publications.
 Halder, Deep (2019). Blood Island: An Oral History of the Marichjhapi Massacre. HarperCollins Publishers India.

1979 in India
1970s in West Bengal
Conflicts in 1978
Conflicts in 1979
Mass murder in 1979
Massacres in 1979
Violence in India
1978 in India
Massacres of Bengali Hindus in India
South 24 Parganas district
1978 murders in India
1979 murders in India
Caste-related violence in India
Massacres of Bengalis